Georges Vivex was a Belgian gymnast who took part in the 1920 Olympic Games in Antwerp. Vivex was an Olympic silver medal at the 1920 Olympics in Antwerp. He was part of the Belgian team who came in second place in the team competition, behind Italy. Five teams took part, and the competition ran on 23 and 24 August 1920.

Olympic medals
 1920  Antwerp - Silver in gymnastics, team competition  Belgium

References

Belgian male artistic gymnasts
Olympic gymnasts of Belgium
Gymnasts at the 1920 Summer Olympics
Olympic silver medalists for Belgium
Date of birth unknown
Date of death unknown
Year of death missing